Vrakas (Greek: Βράκας) is a Greek surname that may refer to
Daniel P. Vrakas (born 1955), American Republican politician and businessman 
Georgios Vrakas (born 2001), Greek football midfielder 
Zisis Vrakas, 19th century Macedonian-Greek Macedonian revolutionary

Greek-language surnames